Kentucky Route 425 (or Henderson Bypass) is the Southern Beltline around Henderson, Kentucky. It is a two-lane road that runs from U.S. Route 60 (US 60) and KY 136 east to Pennyrile Parkway (future I-69) and intersects with US 41A, KY 1299, and US 41. It is a rural highway that is all [at grade intersections. At the US 41A junction, rumble strips are used to alert traffic to the intersections.

Route description
KY 425 begins at an intersection with US 60 and KY 136 west of Henderson, heading southeast on the two-lane undivided Henderson Bypass. The road passes through farmland with some development and comes to a bridge over an abandoned railroad line. The route curves east and comes to an intersection with US 41 Alt. KY 425 passes through more agricultural areas to the south of Henderson and intersects KY 1299. The road comes to a bridge over a CSX railroad line and crosses US 41, KY 136, and KY 2084. The route curves northeast and widens into a divided highway as it comes to its eastern terminus at an interchange with the Pennyrile Parkway (future I-69).

History
The highway was built in the 1980s, and in the intervening years has undergone occasional repair and maintenance work. Sufficient right-of-way exists to expand the road to four lanes, but there are no firm plans to do so.

Major intersections

References

External links
Info

0425